The Cyphonocerinae are a subfamily of fireflies (Lampyridae) with only single genus, Cyphonocerus.

References

Lampyridae
Taxa named by Roy Crowson
Beetle subfamilies